"The One with the Cat" is the second episode of Friends fourth season. It first aired on the NBC network in the United States on October 2, 1997.

Plot
Tired of having to turn sideways every time he enters or leaves his bedroom or risk getting his clothes ripped, Chandler suggests he and Joey sell the entertainment center. Joey objects at first, because he built it himself — and the chick and duck are living in it. He eventually relents and they place an ad for the entertainment center in the newspaper for $50. Two guys come to look at the entertainment center - but unable to pay the $50, they want to trade it for a handmade canoe, which Joey and Chandler reject. While showing the entertainment center off to another buyer, Joey offers the fact that a grown man can fit inside as a selling point. The buyer does not believe him, so Joey crawls inside. The buyer then locks Joey in the unit and steals the rest of their furniture, including their beloved foosball table and recliners. Chandler is upset with Joey upon finding out what happened, so he calls the guys with the canoe back and they finally make their trade.

Monica runs into someone from high school at the bank — Rachel's senior prom date, Chip Matthews. They get to talking, and Chip fulfills an old high school fantasy of Monica's, simply by asking her out. Rachel is upset that Monica would consider dating Chip, because at their prom Chip disappeared for two hours to have sex with another girl. Monica points out that she was not as popular as Rachel in high school, and the "fat girl" inside of her would love to have a chance to date a popular guy, even if it is ten years late. Rachel relents, and agrees to let her go. Monica finally goes on her big date with Chip and is disappointed to learn he has not changed at all since high school. He still hangs out with all his old buddies, works at the same movie theater, and lives with his parents. Monica then dumps Chip, much to Rachel's delight.

Meanwhile, a cat crawls into Phoebe's guitar case. She tries to shoo it away... until she looks at the cat and becomes convinced that the spirit of her adoptive mother Lily resides in the cat, much to Ross's protests. Rachel later finds a flier for a missing cat named Julio — who looks exactly like the cat Phoebe thinks is her reincarnated mother. Ross makes the rest of the gang promise to tell Phoebe. But the gang finds she is so happy with her cat, so none of them can bring themselves to do it until an annoyed Ross finally tells her. Phoebe is upset that Ross will not at least respect her belief that Julio is her mother and support her as a friend, and Rachel suggests that to fix their friendship he apologize to Mrs. Buffay's spirit, which he does. Phoebe agrees to return the cat.

Reception
In the original broadcast, the episode was viewed by 25.5 million viewers.

Sam Ashurst from Digital Spy ranked it #185 on their ranking of the 236 Friends episodes.

Telegraph & Argus also ranked it #185 on their ranking of all 236 Friends episodes.

References

1997 American television episodes
Friends (season 4) episodes